Christina Benecke (born 14 October 1974 in Hamburg) is a volleyball player from Germany. Standing at 190 cm she played as a middle blocker for the German Women's National Team.

She represented her native country at the 2004 Summer Olympics, finishing in ninth place, and at 2003 Women's European Volleyball Championship finishing third, and the 2004 FIVB World Grand Prix.

References

External links 
Christina Benecke at Sports Reference
http://www.gettyimages.com/photos/christina-benecke?excludenudity=true&sort=mostpopular&mediatype=photography&phrase=christina%20benecke
  Profile

German women's volleyball players
Volleyball players at the 2000 Summer Olympics
Volleyball players at the 2004 Summer Olympics
Olympic volleyball players of Germany
Sportspeople from Hamburg
1974 births
Living people